Each country was allowed to enter a team of 11 players and they all were eligible for participation.

CF=Centre Forward
CB=Centre Back
D=Defender
GK=Goalkeeper

Argentina
Argentina had only a squad of eight players entered.

Head coach:

Belgium

Head coach:

Czechoslovakia

Head coach:

France
France had only a squad of nine players entered.

Head coach:

Germany

Head coach: Moritz Nußbaum

Great Britain

Great Britain had only a squad of ten players entered.

Head coach:

Hungary

Head coach:

Ireland

Ireland had only a squad of nine players entered.

Head coach: A.J. Cullen (Clontarf S.C.)

Luxembourg

Head coach:

Malta

Malta had only a squad of nine players entered.

Head coach:

Netherlands

Head coach:

Spain
Spain had only a squad of eight players entered.

Head coach:

Switzerland
Switzerland had only a squad of ten players entered.

Head coach:

United States

Head coach:

References

External links
 Olympic Report
 

1928 Summer Olympics